Andrew Mackay (born November 1, 1985) is an Olympic-swimmer from the Cayman Islands. He swam for the Cayman Islands at the 2004 Olympics,  the 2002 Commonwealth Games, and the 2006 Commonwealth Games. He swam in college in the US for the University of Notre Dame.

In 2003, he became the first Cayman Island swimmer (as well as the first Notre Dame swimmer) to ever qualify for the Olympics.

He swam at:
2002 Commonwealth Games
2003 World Championships
2003 Pan American Games
2004 Olympics
2004 World Championships
2006 Commonwealth Games

References

1985 births
Living people
Caymanian male swimmers
Swimmers at the 2004 Summer Olympics
Olympic swimmers of the Cayman Islands
Swimmers at the 2002 Commonwealth Games
Swimmers at the 2006 Commonwealth Games
Commonwealth Games competitors for the Cayman Islands
Swimmers at the 2003 Pan American Games
Pan American Games competitors for the Cayman Islands
Notre Dame Fighting Irish men's swimmers